The 448th Supply Chain Management Group is an inactive United States Air Force unit. Its last assignment was to the 448th Supply Chain Management Wing at Tinker Air Force Base, Texas, where it was inactivated on 30 June 2010.

The group was first organized during World War II, as the 448th Bombardment Group. The group engaged in the strategic bombing campaign against Germany with Eighth Air Force, flying Consolidated B-24 Liberators from RAF Seething. The group flew its last combat mission on 25 April 1945, attacking a marshalling yard at Salzburg, Austria.

It returned to the United States in July 1945, and was assigned to Second Air Force for Boeing B-29 Superfortress conversion and training at McCook Army Air Field. It moved to Fort Worth Army Air Field, where it became one of the original ten B-29 bombardment groups assigned to Strategic Air Command. The group was inactivated on 4 August 1946 and its aircraft and personnel were reassigned another unit.

Reactivated in 1947 in the Air Force reserve, in 1949 it was reorganized as a light bomber group, It was mobilized in 1951 with its personnel and aircraft being used to bring other units up to full strength before inactivating. The group was again active in the reserve from 1955 to 1957 as the 448th Fighter-Bomber Group.

The group was redesignated the 448th Combat Sustainment Group and activated at Tinker Air Force Base, Oklahoma in 2006, but was inactivated as the 448th Combat Sustainment Group in 2010.

History

World War II

Initial organization and training in the United States
The group was first activated as the 448th Bombardment Group on 1 May 1943 at Gowen Field, Idaho. Its original components were the 712th, 713th, 714th, and 715th Bombardment Squadrons After completing initial training with Consolidated B-24 Liberators, it moved to Wendover Field, Utah for Phase 2 training, and to Sioux City Army Air Base, Iowa for final training. The air echelon completed final processing at Herington Army Air Field, Kansas and deployed with their Liberators via the southern ferry route.

Combat in Europe
The group was established at RAF Seething in early December 1943 and flew its first combat mission on 22 December 1943. it was primarily engaged in the strategic bombing campaign against Germany, attacking ball bearing plants in Berlin, marshalling yards at Cologne, a V-1 flying bomb assembly plant at Fallersleben, aircraft factories in Gotha, an airfield at Hanau, a chemical plant at Ludwigshafen, synthetic oil refineries near Pölitz, aircraft engine plants at Rostock, among other strategic targets. The squadron participated in Big Week, an intensive campaign against German aircraft manufacturing plants from 20 to 25 February 1944.

The squadron was occasionally diverted from its strategic bombing mission to fly interdiction and close air support missions. It bombed V-weapon launch sites, airfields and transportation facilities to support Operation Overlord, the invasion of Normandy, and on D-Day attacked coastal defenses and choke points on German lines of communication. It struck enemy positions to assist the allied attacks on Caen and Operation Cobra, the breakout at Saint Lo. It dropped supplies to allied troops during Operation Market Garden, the attempt to seize a bridgehead across the Rhine in the Netherlands. During the Battle of the Bulge, it attacked transportation and communications targets in December 1944 and January 1945. In the spring of 1945, it again dropped supplies to airborne troops in Operation Varsity, the airborne assault across the Rhine near Wesel. The squadron flew its last combat mission on 25 April 1945, an attack on a railroad yard near Salzburg, Austria. The group flew 262 combat missions, on which it lost 101 bombers, while claiming the destruction of 44 enemy fighters. Joseph C. McConnell the leading United States Air Force fighter ace during the Korean War, served as a navigator with the group.

Cold War

Strategic Air Command
Squadron members were given leave upon arrival in the States and the squadron began to assemble at Sioux Falls Army Air Field, South Dakota in the middle of the month. After training with the Boeing B-29 Superfortress, the squadron moved to Fort Worth Army Air Field, Texas in December 1945. At Fort Worth, it became one of the first units of Strategic Air Command in March 1946. Although B-29 groups were organized with three squadrons, the squadron maintained its four squadron strength until May 1946, when the 715th Bombardment Squadron transferred to the control of the 509th Composite Group and moved to join the 509th the following month. However, in August the group was inactivated and its personnel and equipment were transferred to the 92nd Bombardment Group, which was simultaneously activated.

Air Force reserve

The group was reactivated as a reserve unit under Air Defense Command (ADC) at Long Beach Army Air Field, California in April 1947, where its training was supervised by the 416th AAF Base Unit (later the 2347th Air Force Reserve Training Center). Although nominally a B-29 unit, it is not clear whether or not the group was fully staffed or equipped. In 1948 Continental Air Command (ConAC) assumed responsibility for managing reserve and Air National Guard units from ADC. In June 1949 ConAC reorganized its reserve units under the wing base organization, and the group became a Douglas B-26 Invader unit of the 448th Bombardment Wing. It added the 711th Bombardment Squadron as a fourth squadron, as reserve operational groups were expanded to four squadron strength. However, its operational squadrons were staffed at 25% of normal strength.

In August 1950, the 448th Wing's companion reserve unit at Long Beach, the 452d Bombardment Wing, was mobilized for Korean War service. In order to bring the 452d Wing to combat strength, skilled reservists and reservists who required 60 or fewer days training to qualify them as fully skilled assigned to the 448th Wing were transferred to the 452d Wing. The group itself was called to active duty in the second wave of mobilization in March 1951 and its personnel who had not been transferred to the 452d Wing were used as fillers for other Air Force organizations, while the squadron was inactivated four days later.

The reserve mobilization for the Korean War left it without aircraft, and the reserve did not again receive aircraft until July 1952. When aircraft were assigned, six reserve pilot training wings were activated. However, the Air Force desired that all reserve units be designed to augment the regular forces in the event of a national emergency. Because the pilot training wings had no mobilization mission they were discontinued on 18 May 1955, and replaced by fighter-bomber and troop carrier wings. The group was redesignated the 448th Fighter-Bomber Group and again activated as a reserve unit at Hensley Field, Texas when the 448th Fighter-Bomber Wing replaced the 8709th Pilot Training Wing. The group took over the North American T-28 Trojan aircraft of the 8709th, but soon re-equipped with Lockheed F-80 Shooting Stars.

Despite its fighter bomber designation, the squadron was gained on mobilization by Air Defense Command upon mobilization. The group flew the F-80 until 1957, when it began converting to the North American F-86 Sabre.

However, the Joint Chiefs of Staff were pressuring the Air Force to provide more wartime airlift. At the same time, about 150 Fairchild C-119 Flying Boxcars became available from the active force. Consequently, in November 1956 the Air Force directed Continental Air Command to convert three reserve fighter bomber wings to the troop carrier mission by September 1957. In addition, within the Air Staff was a recommendation that the reserve fighter mission given to the Air National Guard and replaced by the troop carrier mission. As a consequence in November 1957, the 448th and the remainder of the 448th Wing were inactivated when reserve operations at Hensley converted to the airlift mission.

Logistics management

In 2005, Air Force Materiel Command (AFMC) implemented the AFMC Transformation project, which replaced the staff agencies at air logistics centers with wings, groups, and squadrons. The group was redesignated the 448th Eagle Propulsion Sustainment Group and activated at Tinker Air Force Base, Oklahoma on 18 February 2005. It was assigned three newly organized combat sustainment squadrons, the 540th, 541st, and 542nd. A little over a year later, AFMC removed the specific systems from the new groups' designations and the 448th became the 448th Combat Sustainment Group. In 2008, it became the 448th Supply Chain Management Group and its subordinate squadrons were inactivated. In 2010, AFMC returned some supply management functions to logistics complex staffs, and the group was inactivated.

Lineage
 Constituted as the 448th Bombardment Group (Heavy) on 6 April 1943
 Activated on 1 May 1943
 Redesignated 448th Bombardment Group, Heavy on 20 August 1943
 Redesignated 448th Bombardment Group, Very Heavy on 5 August 1945
 Inactivated on 4 August 1946
 Activated in the reserve on 19 April 1947
 Redesignated 448th Bombardment Group, Light on 27 June 1949
 Ordered to active duty on 17 March 1951
 Inactivated on 21 March 1951
 Redesignated 448th Fighter-Bomber Group on 12 April 1955
 Activated on 18 May 1955
 Inactivated on 16 November 1957
 Redesignated 448th Tactical Fighter Group on 31 July 1985 (remained inactive)
 Redesignated 448th Eagle Propulsion Sustainment Group on 31 January 2005
 Activated on 18 February 2005
 Redesignated 448th Combat Sustainment Group on 14 April 2006
 Redesignated 448th Supply Chain Management Group on 1 April 2008
 Inactivated on 30 June 2010

Assignments

 II Bomber Command, 1 May 1943
 Second Air Force, 6 October 1943 – November 1943
 20th Combat Bombardment Wing (later 20th Bombardment Wing), 30 November 1943
 96th Bombardment Wing, 6 July 1945
 Second Air Force, 23 July 1945

 Fifteenth Air Force, 21 March – 4 August 1946
 304th Bombardment Wing, 19 April 1947
 448th Bombardment Wing, 27 June 1949 – 21 March 1951
 448th Fighter-Bomber Wing, 18 May 1955 – 16 November 1957
 448th Combat Sustainment Wing (later 448th Supply Chain Management Wing), 18 February 2005 – 30 June 2010

Components
 540th Combat Sustainment Squadron, 14 April 2006 – 28 April 2008
 541st Combat Sustainment Squadron, 14 April 2006 – 28 April 2008
 542d Combat Sustainment Squadron, 14 April 2006 – 28 April 2008
 546th Combat Sustainment Squadron, 28 Sep 2007 – 28 April 2008
 711th Bombardment Squadron (later 711th Fighter-Bomber Squadron): 27 June 1949 – 21 March 1951; 18 May 1955 – 16 November 1957
 712th Bombardment Squadron: 1 May 1943 – 4 August 1946; 19 April 1947 – 21 March 1951
 713th Bombardment Squadron (later 713th Fighter-Bomber Squadron): 1 May 1943 – 4 August 1946; 19 April 1947 – 21 March 1951; 18 May 1955 – 16 November 1957
 714th Bombardment Squadron: 1 May 1943 – 4 August 1946; 19 April 1947 – 21 March 1951
 715th Bombardment Squadron: 1 May 1943 – 6 May 1946

Stations

 Gowen Field, Idaho, 1 May 1943
 Wendover Field, Utah, c. 3 July 1943
 Sioux City Army Air Base, Iowa, c. 11 September – c. 7 November 1943
 RAF Seething (USAAF Station 146), England c. 1 December 1943 – c. July 1945
 Sioux Falls Army Air Field, South Dakota, c. 15 July 1945

 McCook Army Air Field, Nebraska, c. 8 September 1945
 Fort Worth Army Air Field, Texas, c. December 1945 – 4 August 1946
 Long Beach Army Air Base (later Long Beach Air Force Field, Long Beach Airport), California, 19 April 1947 – 21 March 1951.
 Hensley Field, Texas, 18 May 1955 – 16 November 1957
 Tinker Air Force Base, Oklahoma, 18 February 2005 – 30 June 2010

Aircraft assigned
 Consolidated B-24 Liberator: (1943–1946)
 Douglas B-26 Invader: (1949–1951)
 North American T-28 Trojan: (1955)
 Lockheed F-80 Shooting Star: (1955–1957)
 North American F-86 Sabre: (1957)

References

Notes
 Explanatory notes

 Citations

Bibliorgaphy

 
 
 
 
 
 
 Further reading
 Brett, Jeffrey E. The 448th Bomb Group(H): Liberators over Germany in World War II. Atglen, Pennsylvania: Schiffer Publishing, 2002. .
 
 Freeman, Roger A. The Mighty Eighth: The Colour Record. Cassell & Co., 1991 .

Groups of the United States Air Force